Geek & Sundry is a commercial YouTube and Twitch channel and multimedia production company. It was launched on April 2, 2012 by actress Felicia Day with Kim Evey and Sheri Bryant as part of YouTube's 100 million dollar original channel initiative. In June 2012, Forbes suggested that "if successful, it could help blaze a trail for the future of network television." In 2014, Geek & Sundry was acquired by Legendary Entertainment. The company is primarily known for their launch of the D&D show Critical Role, which aired on their channels from 2015–19.

Geek & Sundry produced many shows exclusively for Legendary's streaming service, Alpha, from its launch in 2017. In early 2019, Critical Role Productions separated from Legendary, as well as Geek & Sundry, to distribute their content independently. In the wake of their departure, Alpha was shut down and Geek & Sundry went into decline. The company "hasn't exactly been operational" since late 2019.

History

Origins (2012–14) 
The channel was originally based around three unscripted programs produced by Day: The Flog (hosted by Day), Sword & Laser (hosted by Veronica Belmont and Tom Merritt) and Tabletop (hosted by actor Wil Wheaton). Before the channel launch, YouTube gave an advance payment "against future advertising revenue to jumpstart production." The channel's founders and show hosts attended a number of fan conventions over the following years including ComicCon, Dragon*Con, VidCon, and WonderCon. In March 2013, the channel announced three new series: Felicia's Ark (featuring Felicia Day), Fetch Quest (created by Jordan Allen-Dutton) and The Player One[s]. Two programs, Tabletop and Space Janitors, were renewed for season 2 of the channel starting April 1, 2013.

in August 2014, Geek & Sundry was acquired by Legendary Entertainment for an undisclosed sum. In December 2014, Geek & Sundry was listed on New Media Rockstars Top 100 Channels, ranked at #68.

Twitch, Alpha and peak (2015–18) 

In March 2015, Geek & Sundry launched their Twitch channel with a 48-hour stream in support of The Lupus Foundation. After Day heard about a private  Dungeons & Dragons home game from Ashley Johnson, she approached the group about playing it in a live-streamed format for Geek & Sundry; Critical Role began airing on March 12, 2015, however, the show remained creator-owned.

On January 11, 2016, Chinese conglomerate Wanda Group announced that it concluded an agreement with shareholders to acquire Legendary Entertainment for $3.5 billion. In April 2016, "Geek & Sundry's website had 290,000 uniques [...], per comScore. On YouTube, where it got its start, it has 1.4 million subscribers". In June 2016, Legendary Digital Networks (LDN) announced a new subscription streaming service, Alpha, which would include programming from both Nerdist and Geek & Sundry. In 2016, Critical Role's spinoff show Talks Machina premiered on Geek & Sundry's Twitch channel; in January 2017, Talks Machina: After Dark premiered on Alpha and included 15–20 minutes of extra cast questions pulled from Alpha viewers.

In 2016, Felicia Day left Geek & Sundry after growing "fatigued in a less creative, more managerial role in the company". Day said "I gave it my heart and my soul. When I realized I had given as much as I could, I needed to move on". In January 2017, it was announced that Thomas Tull, Legendary's founder, had exited as Legendary Entertainment CEO and that Eric Campbell, a writer on Geek & Sundry shows such as The Flog, Felicia's Ark and Signal Boost!, would become the Director of Development for Geek & Sundry. In July, Marisha Ray became the Creative Director.

From 2017 onwards, the network increasingly focused on tabletop gaming shows. This included actual play shows such as Sagas of Sundry, miniature painting with Painter's Guild and game master chat shows such as Roundtable. Season 4 of Wheaton's Tabletop was exclusive to Alpha in 2016 before premiering on YouTube in 2017. The Twitch channel reached its peak subscriber count at 55,349 in February 2018.

Critical Role split (2018–19) 
Legendary started to scale back their digital division after "Joshua Grode took over as the company's CEO in 2018". In June, Critical Role Productions started to self-produce new shows and content which did not air on Geek & Sundry's channels. Ray stepped down from her position at Geek & Sundry to become the Creative Director for Critical Role Productions; Matt Key replaced her as Creative Director, and would remain until the post was eliminated the following year.

In July 2018, the Star Trek role-playing game (RPG) show Shield of Tomorrow ended and was replaced by the superhero RPG show Callisto 6; the cast, with Campbell as the game master, were carried over to the new show. L.A. by Night (based on Vampire: The Masquerade) premiered in September as a weekly show; Jason Carl, Brand Marketing Manager for World of Darkness, acted as the Storyteller.

In February 2019, Critical Role's split from Geek & Sundry and LDN was completed, with their flagship show having been recorded at a new studio since July 2018. Critical Role and Talks Machina aired exclusively on Critical Role's channels from this point onwards, and were no longer distributed via the Alpha streaming service. Prior to the split, Critical Role and Talks Machina had been Geek & Sundry's most popular shows by far. The move also suspended the Alpha exclusive show Talks Machina: After Dark, which would never be reinstated on the new channels. The Alpha service was shut down in March – only weeks after Critical Role left the network – with Geek & Sundry content migrating to their YouTube and Twitch channels. A short-lived D&D show Relics and Rarities premiered on Alpha shortly before the closure of the service; Deborah Ann Woll was the show's DM and the campaign had a celebrity guest each episode. It ran for only six episodes, each presented in two parts. Older episodes of Critical Role and Talks Machina were later deleted and re-uploaded to the new Critical Role channels.

Further splits and layoffs (2019–20)

In April 2019, Wheaton announced that he was suing Geek & Sundry for breach of contract over distribution deals for Titansgrave: The Ashes of Valkana which he was not consulted on. Campbell left Geek & Sundry in the same month, and Relics and Rarities was not picked up for a second season. Some further tabletop shows did however run during 2019, including Jason Bulmahn's Pathfinder: Knights of Everflame and Woll's Lost Odyssey: The Book of Knowledge. The latter was followed by a short series of cast interview videos.

In late 2019, Paradox Interactive's World of Darkness team took over production of L.A. By Night; seasons 1-3 remain archived on the Geek & Sundry YouTube channel while season 4 premiered exclusively on the World of Darkness Twitch channel in 2020. In January 2020, Campbell and the cast of Shield of Tomorrow/Callisto 6 launched a new Star Trek show, Clear Skies, on the QueueTimes Twitch channel. Campbell stated that Clear Skies is not a sequel and that "Shield of Tomorrow is Geek & Sundry‘s (and rightfully so). I had hoped to come back to Shield again, but honestly? We wrapped that story up so well, I love that it will exist forever as a completed campaign." Twitch subscription numbers for the channel declined rapidly from a 50,000 high in January 2018 to 300 in January 2020. Game the Game ceased broadcast in April, and the Geek & Sundry website stopped updating in June with a final episode of How to Play.

In July 2020, Legendary laid off 30% of the LDN staff. Variety reported that "there was a sense that the operations were a money drain on the company's profitable film and television operations. Those cuts were accelerated by the onset of COVID-19, which has resulted in layoffs and furloughs across the entertainment industry". The Hollywood Reporter reported that "the digital brands have become less important to the strategic direction of Legendary in recent years as the online content business has shifted away from the networks that grew big during the early heyday of YouTube stardom. Legendary Digital is not a moneymaker for the business the way its core film and TV divisions are".  Twitch Tracker stopped logging subscriptions in October 2020 for the channel, at which point there were 52 remaining. Nerdist shows such as Save Point and CelebriD&D continued to simultaneously stream on the G&S channels sporadically.

Later activity (2021- present)
After an eight month hiatus, additional episodes of Becca Scott's How to Play began to be posted on YouTube. Released from February 2021 to June 2022, How to Play was the first original content on the channel since the layoffs the previous summer and the sole ongoing G&S property. The show released a new episode approximately once every two months throughout 2021, in a format similar to Scott's How to Game which has been running on the Good Time Society YouTube channel since early 2020. In April 2021, CBR reported that "Geek & Sundry as an original content producer hasn't exactly been operational for a couple of years". From August 2021 to February 2022 the YouTube channel would also re-release older LDN content that had originally been exclusive to Alpha, and therefore unavailable since the shut down in 2019. This included episodes of CelebriD&D and We're Alive: Frontier. 

In January 2022, Wheaton and LDN settled their lawsuit outside of court. The Geek & Sundry website began redirecting to the Nerdist website, and direct links to specific pages using the geekandsundry.com domain began to return 404 links. Geek & Sundry branding has been integrated into the Nerdist website, under the "play" banner. After a six month hiatus the YouTube channel is now used to re-release Nerdist content.

Legacy
International Tabletop Day originated as an event hosted on Geek & Sundry in 2013, and became a recurring annual event globally. While disrupted by the spread of the COVID-19 pandemic in 2020, the event is still celebrated worldwide. Founder Felicia Day, who left the company in 2016, spoke positively of the influence of the company and its inclusion of geek voices. "I'm just happy I got to give people opportunities they wouldn't have otherwise and take a leap."

Em Friedman, for Polygon, commented on the impact of Geek & Sundry's experiments in actual play cinematographic style; the simultaneous display layout, pioneered with Critical Role, would come "to dominate actual play". Friedman highlighted that Critical Role's "layout eliminated the awkward elements of the wide-angle lenses and multipurpose tables, cables, and other clutter. By cropping and arranging, it showed all angles of a table, simultaneously, live"; a simultaneous display led to player reactions becoming "a significant part of the audience experience". However, this "look wasn't a foregone conclusion. There was no standard look early on. Even in 2015, as Critical Role began to stream, Geek & Sundry was producing fullscreen, edited multi-camera shows like Wil Wheaton's Titansgrave. The channel continued to refine both styles, producing fullscreen shows like Sagas of Sundry and We're Alive: Frontier alongside simultaneous-display shows like Shield of Tomorrow, ForeverVerse, Callisto 6, and LA by Night".

A number of former Geek & Sundry shows continued airing in other formats after leaving the network, some continuing beyond when G&S had largely ceased operating in the late 2010s. Additionally, several senior Legendary Digital Networks staff joined Critical Role Productions after it split in 2019, such as Ed Lopez, Rachel Romero, and Ivan van Norman who became head of their tabletop game publishing division Darrington Press. In addition to Critical Role itself, which remains ongoing, the new company continued airing episodes of Talks Machina until the show was retired in 2021. Talks''' role as an aftershow was replaced by 4-Sided Dive in 2022. By 2021, Critical Role was the highest earning channel on Twitch. The first campaign, which aired in its entirety during the G&S era, would receive an animated adaptation which began airing on Amazon Prime Video in 2022. Critical Role has also been credited with the renaissance of Dungeons & Dragons in the late 2010s, along with similar shows such as The Adventure Zone.Vampire the Masquerade: LA by Night was moved to the World of Darkness channel and received a fourth and fifth season before its conclusion in October 2021. LA by Night is also considered canon to the broader ongoing Vampire metaplot. Em Friedman, for Polygon, stated that L.A. by Night "survived Geek & Sundry's decline [...] in no small part to the masterful work of storyteller and series creator Jason Carl". A successor series, New York by Night'', began in 2022.

Programming

Geek & Sundry Vlogs 
Geek & Sundry Vlogs launched on May 19, 2013 as a distinct channel. All vloggers were mentored by Felicia Day and Jenni Powell, producer of The Lizzie Bennet Diaries. Two rounds of expansion followed throughout 2013, with submissions to join the channel open to the public for official review from Geek & Sundry and the community. On February 18, 2015, it was announced that the Vlogs channel would be "coming to an end" after almost two years of operation. The final vlog was added to the channel on February 27.

Vloggers 
 Wordplay Season 2 with Nika "Nikasaur" Harper (Formerly Story Mode)
 Geeking OUT with Becca Canote (Formerly also with Neil McNeil)
 Read This! with James “Tigermonkey” Isaacs (Formerly about his quest to the World Thumbwrestling Championships)
 Sachie
 Talkin' Comics with Amy Dallen (Formerly a weekly show on the main channel)
 Jeff Lewis
 Katie Satow
 Paul Mason the DIY Guy
 Critical Hit Cocktails with Mitch Hutts
 2 Broke Geeks with Mia Resella and Omar Najam
 Cristina Viseu
 Songs of Adventure with Vaughan de Villiers and Caitlin Papier 
 Dael Kingsmill
 Kiriosity with Kiri Callaghan
 Wargaming with Teri Litorco
 Old School Pixel Party with Scott Tumilty 
 Akeem Lawanson
 Holland Talks Movies with Holland Farkas
 Two guest vloggers every other Tuesday

References

External links
 

Webcasters
YouTube channels
Dalian Wanda Group
2012 establishments in California
YouTube channels launched in 2012